Wendling is an unincorporated community in Lane County, Oregon, United States, located northeast of Marcola. Wendling's post office operated from 1899 to 1952. It was named for George X. Wendling, a local lumberman. Wendling was created as a company town for the Booth-Kelly Lumber Company.

History 
A rail line from Coburg, passing through Springfield and Natron, was later extended over Willamette Pass.  A branch from Springfield to Wendling was constructed in 1902.

Fires 

In August 1910, Wendling burned down. It also later burned down again on September 29, 1946.

Wendling Bridge, a covered bridge, carries Wendling Road over Mill Creek at Wendling. Built in 1938, the bridge was added to the National Register of Historic Places in 1979.

See also 

 Hayden Bridge (Springfield, Oregon) – bridge that was part of the Marcola line, which would take lumber to and from Wendling

References

Further reading 

Polley, Louis E. (1989). Wendling, Oregon Logging Camps 1898-1945: Polley Pub. ASIN B006YXHNG6
KRACHT, SHANNON. "Wendling, a Company Town," Lane County Historian 20 (1975): 3-16.

External links 

 Lost Towns: Wendling by the Lane County History Museum

1899 establishments in Oregon
Populated places established in 1899
Company towns in Oregon
Ghost towns in Oregon
Unincorporated communities in Lane County, Oregon
Unincorporated communities in Oregon